Gabriele Bianchi (27 August 1901 – 8 October 1974) was an Italian composer, conductor and teacher.

He was born in Verona and died in Mirano. He studied with Gian Francesco Malipiero at the Venice Conservatory. He was director of the Trieste Conservatory from 1955 and director of the Venice Conservatory from 1960 to 1971. When he was 29 years old, he participated in Biennale della Musica di Venezia with his composition Concerto per orchestra.

References

External links
 Biographical Information (In Italian)
 Magazine with Biographical information  (In Italian)

1901 births
1974 deaths
20th-century classical composers
Italian classical composers
Italian male classical composers
Olympic bronze medalists in art competitions
Musicians from Verona
20th-century Italian composers
Medalists at the 1948 Summer Olympics
20th-century Italian male musicians
Olympic competitors in art competitions